Miloš Nedić (born 17 October 1964) is a Bosnian-Herzegovinian former footballer who played as sweeper or defender for FK Sarajevo and several German clubs.

References

External links
 
 Eintracht Braunschweig statistics at RSSSF.com
 FC Carl Zeiss Jena statistics at RSSSF.com
 FC Sachsen Leipzig statistics at RSSSF.com

1964 births
Living people
Association football midfielders
Yugoslav footballers
Bosnia and Herzegovina footballers
FK Sutjeska Foča players
FK Sarajevo players
Eintracht Braunschweig players
FC Carl Zeiss Jena players
FC Sachsen Leipzig players
FC Rot-Weiß Erfurt players
Yugoslav First League players
2. Bundesliga players
Oberliga (football) players
Regionalliga players
Bosnia and Herzegovina expatriate footballers
Expatriate footballers in Germany
Bosnia and Herzegovina expatriate sportspeople in Germany